Cardiff Saracens Rugby Football Club was formed in 1966 when two of rugby clubs in Cardiff, Wales amalgamated. The former clubs were Roath Park RFC (est. 1889) and Spillers RFC (est. circa 1920). The 'Sarries', as they are known locally, play in black shirts with red piping, black shorts and black socks.

The club run 1st XV team and occasionally a veterans 2nd XV which play from September 1 until May 6 every season. The club's ground is at Roath Park Recreation Ground and their clubhouse is 'The Crofts Hotel', Crofts Street, Cardiff CF24 3DZ about 10 minutes' walk from the pitch.
 
In 2009, having finished as runners-up in the Cardiff & District Premier Division for the previous two seasons, the club was promoted to the Welsh Rugby Union's WRU Division Six Central.

In 2013, having finished top of SWALEC Division Six South East League, club was promoted to the SWALEC Division Five South East League in the 2013-14 season.

From 2014-15 season the restructuring of the WRU rugby leagues saw the club playing in Division 3 East Central C league.

In 2016, having finished as runners-up in the Division 3 East Central C league in the 2015-16 season, the club was promoted to Division 3 East Central B.

Club sponsors for the 2016-17 season are Covert Investigations and Surveillance Ltd, Spicketts Battrick law practice and Jewson building suppliers.

Club honours

Division 3 East Central C League Runners-up 2015-16

SWALEC Division Six South East League Winners 2012-13

Cardiff District Rugby Union Premier League Runners-Up 2007-08, 2008–09

Cardiff District Rugby Union Division 1 winners 2003-04

Ron Lucock Cup Winners: 2000/2001

Mallett Cup Winners: 1896 (Roath Park RFC),1927–28,1932–33,1933–34,1936–37,1938-39 (Spillers RFC)

Ninian Stuart Cup Winners: 1953 (Roath Park RFC), 2006

Harry Parfitt Trophy Winners: 1996

References

http://www.walesonline.co.uk/sport/rugby/amateur-rugby/cardiff-saracens-win-swalec-division-2959817

External links
 Cardiff Saracens RFC website

Welsh rugby union teams